The Mix Tape, Volume III: 60 Minutes of Funk (The Final Chapter) is a mixtape by American DJ Funkmaster Flex. It was released on August 11, 1998, via Loud Records, serving as a sequel to 1997 The Mix Tape, Volume II (60 Minutes of Funk) and the third installment in his 60 Minute of Funk mixtape series. Recording sessions took place at D&D Studios in New York.

It spawned two singles: "Here We Go" featuring Khadejia and The Product G&B, which peaked at #72 on the Billboard Hot 100, and "Wu-Tang Cream Team Line-Up" featuring Wu-Tang Clan members and affiliates, which found minor success on rap & R&B charts.

Commercial performance
The album became Funkmaster Flex's most successful Mix Tape release, peaking at #4 on the Billboard 200 and at #2 on the Top R&B/Hip-Hop Albums while also achieving gold status from the Recording Industry Association of America on November 4, 1998, for sales of 500,000 copies.

Track listing

Notes
 signifies a co-producer.

Charts

Certifications

References

External links

1998 albums
Sequel albums
Loud Records albums
Funkmaster Flex albums
Hip hop compilation albums